Punuariʻi Teriʻitapunui Pōmare, commonly called Teriʻitapunui (born March 20, 1846 – died in September 17, 1888) was a member of the Pōmare family, a royal dynasty in Tahiti. His first two names translate into Tahitian as "Small-trumpet-above-Prince-of-many-sacrifices."

Biography 

He was the fifth son of Pōmare IV, queen of Tahiti, and of her second husband (also first cousin), the prince consort Ariʻifaite a Hiro, a chief from Huahine.

At birth, he was given the title of ariʻirahi (chief) of the district of Afaʻahiti, in Tahiti. Other source state he was given the district of Mahina.

In June 1862, he married the Princess Teriʻinavahoroʻa, from the princely family of Maʻi from Bora-Bora. From this union were born three daughters who both died without issue :

 Princess Teriʻinavahoroʻa Pōmare: born April 15, 1873, died April 12, 1874.
 Princess Tuaraenuiatera Pōmare: born April 13, 1883, died September 5, 1883.

The couple would also adopt his brother Tamatoa V's fourth daughter, whom they named Teriʻinavahoroʻa (1877-1918). She would marry Opuhara Salmon and later his brother Teuraiterai Mote Salmon, having descendants from both husbands.

He was considered by English visitor Constance Gordon-Cumming to "very good fellow, but sadly lame".
The main official post held by Teriʻitapunui was that of President of the Tahitian High Court, called Toʻohitu, which had indigenous jurisdiction over property matters. When his brother, King Pōmare V, decided to hand over the kingdom to France, he was among the notables who, June 29, 1880, countersigned the deed of assignment from Tahiti to France.

Ancestry

See also 
 List of monarchs of Tahiti
 French Polynesia

References

Bibliography
 

1846 births
1888 deaths
Sons of monarchs
Pōmare dynasty